Ken Stanford (born 9 December 1937) is an Irish sports shooter. He competed in two events at the 1980 Summer Olympics.

References

External links
 

1937 births
Living people
Irish male sport shooters
Olympic shooters of Ireland
Shooters at the 1980 Summer Olympics
Sportspeople from Belfast
20th-century Irish people